The 1946 Navy Midshipmen football team represented the United States Naval Academy during the 1946 college football season. With the return Tom Hamilton, head coach from 1936 to 1938, the Midshipmen compiled a 1–8 record and were outscored by their opponents by a combined score of 186 to 105.

Schedule

After the season

The 1947 NFL Draft was held on December 16, 1946. The following Midshipmen were selected.

References

Navy
Navy Midshipmen football seasons
Navy Midshipmen football